See Mercedes-Benz S-Class for a complete overview of all S-Class models.
The Mercedes-Benz W180 is an inline 6-cylinder saloon, coupé, and convertible made from 1954 until 1959. The models associated with the W180 chassis code were the 220a and 220S.

The W180 was one in a range of Mercedes-Benz models to informally receive the "Ponton" nickname. This was in reference to the unibody-type, pontoon-shaped exterior styling which was also featured on the later W128 line.

220a (W180 I)

From the side, these six-cylinder cars can readily be distinguished from their shorter four-cylinder siblings by the extra "quarter light" windows incorporated in the rear doors.

Production of the 220a ended in April 1956, with 25,937 units produced.

220S (W180 II)
The 220a was succeeded in March 1956 by the 220S, which was externally almost identical, but had an upgraded version of the 2.2L inline-six (later ), due to the use of twin-carburetors.

Visually, the 220S featured a new one piece front bumper, instead of the 3-piece bumper used on the 220a. Also, the twin chrome and rubber strips running under the doors of the 220a were replaced with solid chrome strips. The most obvious difference is the addition of a chrome strip running along the front fenders and doors of the 220S.

The 220S was available with a 4-speed column shift manual transmission, with an optional Hydrak automatic clutch. This made use of small microswitches on the gear selector that automatically disengaged the clutch when the driver changed gears. Many cars have subsequently been converted to use a regular manual clutch, due to the high maintenance costs of continuing to use the Hydrak clutch.

Also introduced with the 220S was the W105 219, which from the a-pillar forward was essentially a single-carburettor 220a, but rearward from the a-pillar it used the shorter body of the W120/W121 180/190 models.

In July 1956 a convertible (two doors, four seats) joined the line-up, and in October 1956 a coupé version followed suit. Some convertibles were finished with folding rear seats to accommodate additional luggage.

Until October 1959, 55,279 220S saloons and 3,429 convertibles and coupés were built.

The fuel-injected 220SE versions that officially bore the model code W128 were introduced in October 1958 and carried on until November 1960.

References

Notes

Bibliography

External links

W180
W180
Limousines
Sedans
Cars introduced in 1954